The Treaty of Lisbon is a treaty on the borders of Spain and Portugal from the mouth of the Minho River to the junction of the Caia River with the Guadiana River. Signed in Lisbon on 29 September 1864, it abolished the Couto Misto microstate.

The final act of approving annexes to the treaty was signed at Lisbon on 4 November 1866.

External links

 Entry from UN Treaty Collection (#906)
 Entry for the annexes

1864 in Portugal
1864 in Spain
Portugal–Spain border
Lisbon (1864)
Lisbon (1864)
Lisbon (1864)
Lisbon (1864)
Lisbon (1864)